World War 1 in Colour is a six-episode television documentary series recounting the major events of World War I narrated by Kenneth Branagh. The first of its six parts aired on 23 July 2003. The series consists of colourised footage, with the colour of the images having been enhanced by computer-aided technology. It reportedly took 400 technicians over a period of five months to colourise the footage.

The series investigates the development of warfare throughout the five years of World War 1 from all sides of the armed forces and also includes never before seen interviews from survivors of the Great War. In 2005, the series was released on DVD in the US. The World War 1 in Colour DVD is presented as two discs, with three episodes apiece on the two discs.

Features
The series features interviews with a number of World War I veterans:

Arthur Barraclough (1898–2004)
Harry Patch (1898–2009), Britain's last survivor of the trenches
Fred Bunday (1900–2002)
Arthur Halestrap (1898–2004)
Hubert Williams (1896–2002), the last pilot of the Royal Flying Corps of WWI
Bill Stone (1900–2009), the penultimate Royal Navy veteran of WWI
Jack Davis (1895–2003), the last of Kitchener's Volunteers

Episodes

DVD extras
50 minute CGI special Tactics & Strategy
15 minutes of interviews with the production team (Making the Series)

See also
World War II in Colour

References

External links

2003 British television series debuts
2003 British television series endings
British television documentaries
English-language television shows
Documentary television series about World War I
2000s British television miniseries